The National Road Series is a series of bicycle races held each year in Australia, constituting the chief domestic road racing competition for cyclists.

Overview
The series is organised by Cycling Australia. It includes one-day races, multi-stage tours, and criteriums. Races have been broadcast on SBS in past years. Since 2012, when Subaru became the naming rights sponsor, the series has also been known as the Subaru National Road Series.
The series has produced many major UCI World Tour riders including Caleb Ewan, Grace Brown and Patrick Bevin.

Events
Past events have included:

Teams

Men's teams

Women's teams

References

Cycling events in Australia